Mark Buckingham may refer to:

 Mark Buckingham (comic book artist) (born 1966), British comic book artist
 Mark Buckingham (rower) (born 1964), British rower